Poloka is a village in Central District of Botswana. The village is located 120 km north of the capital city Gaborone and 80 km south-east of Mahalapye. Poloka has a primary school, and the population was 563 in 2001 census.

References

Populated places in Central District (Botswana)
Villages in Botswana